Sue Coleman (born March 1947) is a Wildlife painter from England who moved to Vancouver Island, in Canada in 1967. Coleman is known for her watercolour paintings in which she uses a controversial Indigenous art style. She also paints west-coast scenes, wildlife, and landscapes. Coleman has written and illustrated seven books.

Career
Always willing to share her experiences, Sue has contributed to many foundations and helped raise funds for conservation and preservation of the wilderness and the wildlife inhabitants. One of her pieces called "Sansum Point" raised $15,000.00 towards protecting the land from development.

In the 1980s, Coleman began to study the West Coast First Nation's style of art work. She traveled coastal Alaska, BC and into Washington State, comparing legends and different art styles. Her goal was to find similarities and the common identifying combination of shapes that represented the different forms of wildlife in the region. Her mission; to document and explain, in a visual form, the dominant features within the indigenous art; such as a curved beak for an eagle or straight one for a raven. This simplification was to make it easily understandable to non-indigenous and visitors alike.

An accumulation of eight years of study is presented in the book "An Artist Vision"; a collection of her earlier pieces.

Traveling on a two-week trip to Alaska, Sue befriended Martine Reid, and on return to BC visited the noted artist Bill Reid. His stories and advice proved invaluable in her understanding of the life lines and greatly influenced her later work. After studying Indigenous art, she began to paint very distinctive Watercolor paintings considered interpretations of Indigenous art.

Controversy
Coleman's style is often referred to as a reflection of Indigenous art work. Some people were confused, and mistakenly believed that her paintings were done by an Indigenous artist. Although Sue considered this a compliment to her skill as an artist, she always claimed to be an English emigrant. Her work has been referred to by some as Cultural appropriations or Knockoffs of Indigenous artwork.

Coleman once described herself as a "translator" of Indigenous art forms which drew criticism. Prominent Indigenous artists George Littlechild, Roy Henry Vickers and Richard Hunt signed an open letter critical of Coleman's appropriation of Indigenous art. Over the years Coleman's art style has changed. During an interview with CBC, Coleman said she is beginning to do art in a completely different style, introducing some of her own Celtic roots.

From the onset of her career Sue, proud of her roots, has never claimed to be indigenous, although the opportunity to become adopted was offered to her. Feeling that it may cause confusion and would betray her own roots, Sue refused the offer. However, due to recent misunderstandings, she now prominently displays her status as a "Non aboriginal Canadian artist".

Awards
"Silver Teal Award" (1994). Presented by Ducks Unlimited in British Columbia

Books 
 An Artist’s Vision (1989) By Sue Coleman
Artist at Large in the Queen Charlotte Islands (1992) By Sue Coleman
Artist at Large along the South Coast of Alaska (1993) By Sue Coleman
"Biggle Foo meets Stinky" (1997) By Sue Coleman
Biggle Foo Becomes a Legend (1997) By Sue Coleman
Return of the Raven (2013) By Sue Coleman
The Trumpeter Swan (2015) By Sue Coleman

Personal
Coleman is from Colchester, Essex England. In 1967, she married Canadian Dan Coleman (whom she met in high school while Dan lived with his mother in Colchester), and she lives in Cowichan Bay. Coleman was trained as a pastry chef but began painting in the 1980s. Coleman works to promote environmental conservation.

See also
Cultural Appropriation
Visual arts by indigenous peoples of the Americas

External links 
Sue Coleman

References

1947 births
Living people
20th-century English painters
20th-century English women artists
20th-century Canadian painters
20th-century Canadian women artists
Artists from British Columbia
British emigrants to Canada